Harry Rapf (16 October 1880, in New York City – 6 February 1949, in Los Angeles), was an American film producer.

Biography
Born to a Jewish family, Rapf began his career in 1917, and during a 20-year career became a well-known producer of films for Metro-Goldwyn-Mayer. He created the comedic duo Dane & Arthur featuring Karl Dane and George K. Arthur in the late 1920s.

Rapf was also one of the founding members of the Academy of Motion Picture Arts and Sciences. He was entombed at Home of Peace Cemetery in East Los Angeles, California.

He had two sons: screenwriter and professor of film studies Maurice Rapf and film/television producer and screenwriter Matthew Rapf.

Filmography

References

External links 

 
 

1880 births
1949 deaths
Academy of Motion Picture Arts and Sciences founders
Film producers from New York (state)
American Jews
Film directors from New York City